Strange Bedfellows (a phrase first used in the Shakespeare play The Tempest) may refer to:

Films 
 Strange Bedfellows (1965 film)
 The Strange Bedfellow, a 1986 Hong Kong film
 Strange Bedfellows (2004 film)

TV episodes 
 "Strange Bedfellows", an episode of Columbo
 Strange Bedfellows (Star Trek: Deep Space Nine), an episode of Star Trek: Deep Space Nine
 Strange Bedfellows (The Drew Carey Show), an episode of The Drew Carey Show
 Strange Bedfellows (The Golden Girls), an episode of The Golden Girls
 Strange Bedfellows (Oz), an episode of Oz
 "Strange Bedfellows", an episode of Shark
Strange Bedfellows (ER), an episode of ER
Strange Bedfellows (Cheers), an episode of Cheers
 "Strange Bedfellows", an episode of Three's Company
 "Strange Bedfellows", an episode of Naruto Shippuden

Comics 
Strange Bedfellows (Angel comic), a trade paperback collecting comic stories based on the Angel television series